Kames is a small village on the Cowal peninsula in Argyll and Bute, Scotland, on the shore of the west arm of the Kyles of Bute.

Kames is now part of a continuous coastal strip of housing that joins onto Tighnabruaich.  Kames has a grocery shop (containing a post office, and relaunched under new management as the "Kames Village Store" in late 2016), a church and a hotel.

The Kames Hotel has views over the west arm of the Kyles of Bute.

History

Between 1839 and 1921 the village was involved in the transit of gunpowder that was made in the nearby inland settlement of Millhouse.  The gunpowder plant owners built a pier and quay for the transport of their products.

Sport and leisure

The Kyles of Bute golf club is located above Kames and was founded in 1907.  It is a nine-hole course and has no bunkers, as the terrain provides enough hazards on the course.

Notable people

The artist Hamilton Macallum (1841–1896) was born in Kames.

Gallery

References

External links

 Kyles of Bute golf club - website

Villages in Cowal
Highlands and Islands of Scotland